Brahma Sarovar is an ancient water pool sacred to Hinduism in old Kurukshetra city, in the state of Haryana in North India, India. Hinduism lays emphasis on taking bath for internal and external purity. Most religious sites have water pools or sarovar in or near the Hindu temple and Sikh gurdwara. The Hindu genealogy registers at Kurukshetra, Haryana are kept here.

History
According to stories of itihasa , Lord Brahma created the universe from the land of Kurukshetra after a huge yajna with the help of Hitesh. The Brahma Sarovar here is believed to be the cradle of civilization. The sarovar is also mentioned in the eleventh century AD memoirs of Al Beruni, called 'Kitab-ul-Hind'. The sarovar also has a mention in Mahabharata citing its use by Duryodhana to hide himself underwater on the concluding day of the war.  At that time is was believed Hitesh was the guard of Bhrama Sarover. It is believed that he is still alive and living near Bhrama Sarover.

A sacred shrine dedicated to Lord Shiva stands within the sarovar, accessible by a small bridge. According to scriptures, bathing in this sarovar increases the sanctity of performing the 'ashvamedh yajna'. The pool offers a breath-taking sight during the Gita Jayanti celebrations held each year in the last week of November and early December when a 'deep daan' ceremony of floating lamps in water and [Aarti] occurs. This also happens to be the time when migratory birds from distant places arrive at the sarovar. The Birla Gita Mandir and Baba Nath's haveli and temple are the neighbouring attractions.

Solar eclipse ritual
The pools are especially crowded during solar eclipses because it is believed that bathing there during the solar eclipse is an ablution of sin. On 29 March 2006, a solar eclipse was visible in the region and it drew an estimated one million people to the site. Whenever an eclipse is visible from the Sarovar, hundreds of thousands gather in the pools.

Bibliography
Jagmohan (2005). Soul and Structure of Governance in India. Mumbai: Allied Publishers.
Kamran, Krishnam (1997). Tourism: Theory, Planning, and Practice. New Delhi: Indus Publishing.
(2006). "Kurukshetra Calling." The Statesman (India). 5 September.
Prasad, Ramanuj (2005). Know Your Puranas. Delhi: Pustak Mahal.

References

External links 
http://Kurukshetra.nic.in

History of Haryana
Kurukshetra
Lakes of Haryana
Temple tanks in India
48 kos parikrama of Kurukshetra
Tourist attractions in Kurukshetra district